With My Song is a 1980 album by Debby Boone and her second studio album of that year. It was also her first to feature Christian music.

Track listing
 "Sweet Adoration" (Brown Bannister, Dawn Rodgers, Lynn Sutter-Adler) [2:54]
 "If Ever" (Pam Mark Hall) [4:34]
 "With Every Breath" (Bryan MacLean) [2:22]
 "With My Song" (Dony McGuire, Reba Rambo) [4:40]
 "I Am Stone" (Phill McHugh) [4:34]
 "Lord, I Believe" (Shane Keister, Alice Keister) [3:19]
 "Morningstar" (Hall) [4:45]
 "A New Song" (Bob Kauflin) [3:35]
 "The Twenty-Third Psalm" (Marty Goetz) [2:50]
 "Holy Father" (Arranged by Brown Bannister) [4:01]
 "Sixty Second Sonata" (Bob Farnsworth) [1:30]
 "What Can I Do for You" (Bob Dylan) [2:58]

Production credits
Producer
Brown Bannister
Arranger
Brown Bannister

Engineers
Brown Bannister
Jimmy Burch
Brent King
Warren Peterson
Jack Joseph Puig

Mastering
Glenn Meadows

Remixing
Brown Bannister
Jimmy Burch
Brent King
Warren Peterson

Overdubs
Jimmy Burch
Warren Peterson

Rhythm Track
Jack Joseph Puig

Bass
Abraham Laboriel
Leland Sklar

Drums
Paul Leim

Guitar (Acoustic)
Johnny Christopher
Steve Kara
Don Roth
Billy Joe Walker Jr.

Guitar (Electric)
Billy Joe Walker Jr.

Harp
Cindy Reynolds

Horn
Dennis Good
Billy Puett
Don Sheffield
Denis Solee
George Tidwell

Oboe
Bobby G. Taylor

Piano
John Hobbs
Shane Keister
Larry Muhoberac

Percussion
Farrell Morris

Synthesizer
Shane Keister

Background Vocals
Mark Baldwin
Steve Brantley
Thomas Cain
Linda Corbin
Bruce Dees
Diana DeWitt
Theresa Ellis
Janie Fricke
Marty Goetz
Teresa Jones
Bob Kauflin
Marty McCall
Donna McElroy
Don Nalle
Ed Nalle
Gary Pigg

References

1980 albums
Debby Boone albums